Langvasshøi is a mountain in Lom Municipality in Innlandet county, Norway. The mountain is surrounded by several other notable mountains including Urdadalstindene, Visbretinden, and Semelholstinden to the northeast; Semeltinden to the southeast; Skarddalstinden and Skarddalseggi o to the south; Høgvagltindene to the southwest; Kyrkja and Kyrkjeoksli to the northwest; and Tverrbytthornet to the north.

See also
List of mountains of Norway by height

References

Jotunheimen
Lom, Norway
Mountains of Innlandet